A factorial prime is a prime number that is one less or one more than a factorial (all factorials greater than 1 are even).

The first 10 factorial primes (for n = 1, 2, 3, 4, 6, 7, 11, 12, 14) are :
2 (0! + 1 or 1! + 1), 3 (2! + 1), 5 (3! − 1), 7 (3! + 1), 23 (4! − 1), 719 (6! − 1), 5039 (7! − 1), 39916801 (11! + 1), 479001599 (12! − 1), 87178291199 (14! − 1), ...

n! − 1 is prime for :
n = 3, 4, 6, 7, 12, 14, 30, 32, 33, 38, 94, 166, 324, 379, 469, 546, 974, 1963, 3507, 3610, 6917, 21480, 34790, 94550, 103040, 147855, 208003, ... (resulting in 27 factorial primes)

n! + 1 is prime for :
n = 0, 1, 2, 3, 11, 27, 37, 41, 73, 77, 116, 154, 320, 340, 399, 427, 872, 1477, 6380, 26951, 110059, 150209, 288465, 308084, 422429, ... (resulting in 24 factorial primes - the prime 2 is repeated)

No other factorial primes are known .

When both n! + 1 and n! − 1 are composite, there must be at least 2n + 1 consecutive composite numbers around n!, since besides n! ± 1 and n! itself, also, each number of form n! ± k is divisible by k for 2 ≤ k ≤ n.  However, the necessary length of this gap is asymptotically smaller than the average composite run for integers of similar size (see prime gap).

See also
 Primorial prime

External links
 
 The Top Twenty: Factorial primes from the Prime Pages
 Factorial Prime Search from PrimeGrid

References

Integer sequences
Classes of prime numbers
Factorial and binomial topics